Manuel B. García Álvarez is a Spanish jurist and emeritus university professor, of the department of Constitutional Law of the University of León. He was the first Ombudsman (Procurador del Común) of Castile and León between 1995 and 2005.

Biography 
Alvarez studied at the University of Oviedo from 1960 to 1965 and was awarded a degree in law, having been appointed assistant professor at the University of Leon. After a course in Advanced European Studies at the College of Europe in Bruges from 1967 to 1968, he was awarded a Doctor of Law at the University of Oviedo in 1971 with a thesis titled: Los clubs políticos en Europa : contribución al estudio de las fuerzas póliticas (Political Clubs in Europe: Contribution to the Study of Political Forces).

From September 1974 to February 1976, Alvarez was Visiting Research Associate at Harvard University on the Scholarship programme of cultural cooperation. In 1980 he was granted the same scholarship, but to take it up he had to renounce having been appointed professor assistant at the University of Leon, where in 1988 he was granted the Chair of Constitutional Law at the University of Leon.

From 1976 until his retirement he was member of the Board of Editors of the East European Quarterly of the University of Colorado.

In 1985, Alvarez took part in the signing of an agreement between the Voronezh State University and Leon, which allowed him to develop an important task of research in the Russian Federation. Among others he worked as foreign expert both in the constitutional commission and in the constitutional assembly created in the summer of 1993 by President Boris Yeltsin. 

In 1995, Alvarez was appointed by the Cortes of Castile and León as Procurador del Común (Ombudsman) of that Autonomous region, where he remained until his retirement in the year 2012.

Bibliography
Alvarez  has written the following books:
 
 
 
 
 
 

Alvarez has co-written the following monograph:
 

Alvarex has written the following newspaper articles:

References

External links 
Widely held works by Manuel García Álvarez
Garcia Alvarez: articles in English
Letters of thanks from the Council of Europe

Ombudsmen in Spain
1943 births
Living people
Spanish jurists
Council of Europe people
Spanish human rights activists